Daniel Trujillo (born 24 May 1918, date of death unknown) was a Venezuelan sailor. He competed in the Dragon event at the 1968 Summer Olympics.

References

External links
 

1918 births
Year of death missing
Venezuelan male sailors (sport)
Olympic sailors of Venezuela
Sailors at the 1968 Summer Olympics – Dragon
20th-century Venezuelan people